The 1998–99 season saw St Johnstone compete in the Scottish Premier League where they finished in 3rd position with 57 points, qualifying for the UEFA Cup. They also reached the 1998 Scottish League Cup Final, losing 2–1 to Rangers.

Results
St Johnstone's score comes first

Legend

Scottish Premier League

Scottish Cup

Scottish League Cup

Final league table

References

External links
 St Johnstone 1998–99 at Soccerbase.com (select relevant season from dropdown list)

St Johnstone F.C. seasons
St Johnstone